Kadina is a town on the Yorke Peninsula of the Australian state of South Australia, approximately 144 kilometres north-northwest of the state capital of Adelaide. The largest town of the Peninsula, Kadina is one of the three Copper Triangle towns famous for their shared copper mining history. The three towns are known as "Little Cornwall" for the significant number of immigrants from Cornwall who worked at the mines in the late 19th century.

Kadina's surrounds form an important agricultural base for the region, and are used for growing cereal crops. Kadina used to be a mining town but now the majority of Kadina's land is used for farming.

Description
There are 6 suburbs making up Kadina's township, each being a distinct historic locality or hamlet. These are: Jericho, Jerusalem, Matta Flat, New Town and Wallaroo Mines as well as central Kadina itself. Kadina East was previously a gazetted suburb east of Kadina's centre, later merged into Kadina itself.

History

Aboriginal
The Narungga are the group of Indigenous Australians whose traditional lands include what is now termed Yorke Peninsula in South Australia. The name "Kadina" is thought to be derived from Kadiyinya, a Narungga word meaning 'Lizard Plain'.

European
Copper was discovered at Wallaroo Mines in 1859 and adjacent land north east of the site was surveyed in 1861 to house miners and became the Government Town of Kadina. Exceptional amounts of copper were found in the following years. Copper was also found in large amounts at the nearby Matta Mine and Doora Mine. The copper mines attracted many highly experienced Cornish miners to Kadina.

In 1862, the Hundred of Wallaroo and Hundred of Kadina were proclaimed in order to allow parcels of land to be sold in the vicinity of the copper mines. In the same year a horse-drawn railway from Kadina to the port at Wallaroo, west of the town, was opened. Further lines connecting Kadina to Port Wakefield, to the southeast, and Bute, to the northeast (Kadina-Brinkworth railway line), opened in 1878 and 1879, respectively.

In 1872 Kadina became a municipality by establishment of the Corporate Town of Kadina. By 1875, the population had increased to 20,000, mostly composed of Cornish miners. In 1907 the adjacent Government Town of Kadina East was surveyed west of Eliza Terrace to cope with the need to house the growing population of the town.

Mining at Kadina ceased completely in 1938, and the rail lines fell into disuse and were closed in 1989.

Heritage listings
Kadina has a number of heritage-listed sites, including:
 Drain Road: Kadina Cemetery
 36-38 Taylor Street: Humphries Barber Shop
 51 Taylor Street: Kadina Town Hall

Geography and climate
Kadina exists in a semi-arid location, above Goyder's Line, and is surrounded by mallee scrub.
Kadina experiences a cold-semi arid climate, bordering on a hot-summer mediterranean climate (Köppen climate classification: BSk/Csa), Trewartha: BSal/Csal); with warm to hot, dry summers; mild to warm, relatively dry springs and autumns; and mild, relatively dry winters.
Due to its location, the seasonal temperature variations are more extreme than Adelaide's. The weather patterns are similar to those of Adelaide.

Governance
Kadina is located within the local government area of the Copper Coast Council, which was formed in 1997. The Copper Coast Council replaced the District Council of Kadina, which existed from 1888 to 1984, and the District Council of Northern Yorke Peninsula. The Corporate Town of Kadina, which had existed since 1872, was previously merged into the District Council of Kadina in 1977.

Kadina is part of the federal division of Grey and lies within the state electoral district of Narungga.

Local economy

Mining
Kadina was once chiefly a copper mining town with the Wallaroo Mines being south-westerly adjacent to the township. Since the closure of the mine in the 1920s, agriculture has been the dominant local industry.

Broadacre cropping
Kadina is surrounded by lands used for broadacre cereal cropping. Staples such as barley, wheat as well as various oilseeds and legumes like canola, chickpeas and field peas are commonly grown in the area. Barley and wheat from the region is considered to be some of the best in the world.

Tourism
The town today consists of important historical colonial and federation buildings gathered around Victoria Square. Kadina also contains the Farm Shed Museum & Tourism Centre (Kadina Heritage Museum) and remnants of the Wallaroo Mines. Kernewek Lowender, a Cornish festival, is held every odd year in May in Kadina (as well as Moonta and Wallaroo, with each location hosting the festival for one day). Kadina and its surrounds benefit generally from the tourism throughout the Copper Triangle and has experienced general growth due throughout the 2000s and 2010s due to the Copper Cove housing development at Wallaroo.

Media
The town serves as the base for local radio station Gulf FM, broadcasting at 89.3 FM. The Yorke Peninsula Country Times newspaper is based in Kadina.

Notable people
 Oliver Badman (1885–1977), politician
 Richard Champion (b. 1968), former AFL footballer
 Lynton Crosby (b.1957), political strategist
 John Olsen (b. 1945), former South Australian Premier and South Australian Federal Senator
 Rex Pearson (1905–1961), politician
 Steve Prestwich (1954–2011), musician
 Cameron Sutcliffe (b.1992), AFL Footballer 
 Horace Wilson (1864–1923), cricketer
 Leslie Heath (1902–1957), politician

Gallery

See also
 Wallaroo, South Australia
 Moonta, South Australia
 Cornish emigration
 Kernewek Lowender

References

External links
Yorke Peninsula website
Yorke Peninsula: Kadina
Copper Coast Council: Kadina

Cornish-Australian culture
Mining towns in South Australia
1861 establishments in Australia